Chlorbenzoxamine is a drug used for functional gastrointestinal disorders.

Synthesis

See also
Carbinoxamine

References

Piperazines
Ethers
Chloroarenes